The Phantom Stage is a 1939 American musical Western film – a "B" movie – directed by George Waggner and starring Bob Baker as a singing cowboy.

Plot
Bob Carson and his sidekick Grizzly hear that a stagecoach owned by Mary is being mysteriously robbed of gold shipments. The gold is placed in the strongbox, but has vanished when the stagecoach arrives at its destination. Carson takes on the job of driving the stage. It turns out that a local bad guy has a small accomplice who hides in a case that is shipped on the stage, and slips out to steal the gold from the strongbox during the journey, then retreats to the case. At the other end, the case is taken away but the strongbox is empty. 
Carson works out the trick, hides in the case, is discovered, escapes, and the villain is captured. With the problem solved, Carson marries Mary.

Production
The Phantom Stage was the last of Universal's singing cowboy movies featuring Bob Baker.

Reception
A reviewer said of the gold theft approach, "... this plot element is handled in so ludicrous a manner that Bob Baker's musical interludes actually come as a relief!"

References

Sources

 
 
 

1939 Western (genre) films
1939 films
Universal Pictures films
Films directed by George Waggner
American Western (genre) films
American black-and-white films
1930s American films